Kameyama Dam is a gravity dam located in Chiba Prefecture in Japan. The dam is used for flood control and water supply. The catchment area of the dam is 69.7 km2. The dam impounds about 139  ha of land when full and can store 14750 thousand cubic meters of water. The construction of the dam was started on 1969 and completed in 1980.

References

Dams in Chiba Prefecture
1980 establishments in Japan